The Battle on the Bayou is the name given to the college football rivalry between the Louisiana Ragin' Cajuns and the Louisiana–Monroe Warhawks.

History
This intrastate rivalry has been played 58 times. The Louisiana Ragin' Cajuns currently hold a 31–26 edge in the series, with the most recent match-up was won by Louisiana–Monroe 21–17. Both schools are members of the Sun Belt Conference. The Battle on the Bayou is a rivalry not just in football, but in all sports when the Cajuns and Warhawks meet.

Game results

Notes

References

College football rivalries in the United States
Louisiana Ragin' Cajuns football
Louisiana–Monroe Warhawks football
1951 establishments in Louisiana
Recurring sporting events established in 1951
Louisiana culture